The Puritan migration to New England was marked in its effects from 1620 to 1640, declining sharply afterwards. The term Great Migration usually refers to the migration in the period of English Puritans to the New England colonies, starting with Plymouth Colony and Massachusetts Bay Colony. They came in family groups rather than as isolated individuals and were mainly motivated for freedom to practice their beliefs.

Context

King James VI and Charles I made some efforts to reconcile the Puritan clergy who had been alienated by the lack of change in the Church of England. Puritans embraced Calvinism (Reformed theology) with its opposition to ritual and an emphasis on preaching, a growing sabbatarianism, and preference for a presbyterian system of church polity, as opposed to the episcopal polity of the Church of England, which had also preserved medieval canon law almost intact. They opposed church practices that resembled Roman Catholic ritual.

This religious conflict worsened after Charles I became king in 1625, and Parliament increasingly opposed his authority. In 1629, Charles dissolved Parliament with no intention of summoning a new one in an ill-fated attempt to neutralize his enemies there, which included numerous Puritans. With the religious and political climate so unpromising, many Puritans decided to leave the country. Some of the migrants were also English expatriate communities of Nonconformists and Separatists from the Dutch Republic who had fled to the European mainland since the 1590s.

The Winthrop Fleet of 1630 included 11 ships led by the flagship Arbella, and it delivered some 700 passengers to the Massachusetts Bay Colony. Migration continued until Parliament was reconvened in 1640, when the scale dropped off sharply. The English Civil War began in 1641, and some colonists returned from New England to England to fight on the Puritan side. Many then remained in England since Oliver Cromwell backed Parliament as an Independent.

The Great Migration saw 80,000 people leave England, roughly 20,000 migrating to each of four destinations: Ireland, New England, the West Indies, and the Netherlands. The immigrants to New England came from every English county except Westmorland; nearly half were from East Anglia. The colonists to New England were mostly families with some education who were leading relatively prosperous lives in England.  One modern writer, however, estimates that 7 to 10 percent of the colonists returned to England after 1640, including about a third of the clergymen.

Religious societies in New England

A group of separatist Puritans had fled from England to the Netherlands because they were unhappy with the insufficient reforms of the English church, and to escape persecution. After a few years, however, they began to fear that their children would lose their English identities, so they traveled to the New World in 1620 and established Plymouth Plantation. They and the later wave of Puritan immigrants created a deeply religious, socially tight-knit, and politically innovative culture that is still present within the United States. They hoped that this new land would serve as a "redeemer nation." They fled England and attempted to create a "nation of saints" in America, an intensely religious, thoroughly righteous community designed to be an example for all of Europe and the rest of the world.

Roger Williams preached religious toleration, separation of church and state, and a complete break with the Church of England. He was banished in 1635 from the Massachusetts Bay Colony and founded Providence Plantations, which became the Rhode Island Colony. The Rhode Island Colony provided a haven for Anne Hutchinson, who had been tried and banished from Massachusetts Bay in 1638 for her Antinomian beliefs. Quakers were also expelled from Massachusetts, but they were welcomed in Rhode Island. In 1658, a group of Jews were welcomed to settle in Newport; they were fleeing the Inquisition in Spain and Portugal but had not been permitted to settle elsewhere. The Newport congregation is now referred to as Jeshuat Israel and is the second-oldest Jewish congregation in the United States.

See also
 History of Massachusetts
 English Civil War, for further details on King Charles I's conflicts with parliament.
 Great Migration Study Project

References

Further reading
 
  Three volumes.
 Anderson, Virginia DeJohn. "Migrants and Motives: Religion and the Settlement of New England, 1630–1640," New England Quarterly, Vol. 58, No. 3 (Sep., 1985), pp. 339–383 in JSTOR
 Anderson, Virginia DeJohn. New England's Generation: The Great Migration and the Formation of Society and Culture in the Seventeenth Century (1991) excerpt and text search
 Bailyn, Bernard. The Peopling of British North America: An Introduction (1988) excerpt and text search
 Breen Timothy H., and Stephen Foster. "Moving to the New World: The Character of Early Massachusetts Migration," William & Mary Quarterly 30 (1973): 189–222 in JSTOR
 Cressy, David. Coming Over: Migration and Communication between England and New England in the Seventeenth Century (1987),
 Dunn, Richard S. Puritans and Yankees: The Winthrop Dynasty of New England, 1630–1717 (1962).
 Fischer, David Hackett. Albion's Seed: Four British Folkways in America (1989), comprehensive look at major ethnic groups excerpt and text search
 Rutman, Darrett B. Winthrop's Boston (1965).
 Thompson, Roger. Mobility and Migration: East Anglian Founders of New England, 1629–1640, (1994) online edition

English colonization of the Americas
Immigrants to the Thirteen Colonies
History of immigration to the United States
History of the Thirteen Colonies
History of New England